The Archdeacon of Orkney was the head of the Archdeaconry of Orkney, a sub-division of the Diocese of Orkney in Scotland. This archdeacon was one of the two archdeacons of the diocese, the other being the Archdeacon of Shetland.

List of known archdeacons of Orkney
 William, 1309-1310
 William de Buchan, 1369-1372 (afterwards Archdeacon of Shetland).
 Johne Thome, x 1429
 John Patrickson, 1419
 William Brown, 1420
 Thomas de Greenlaw, 1422-1424
 Simon de Greenlaw, 1422
 Andrew de Tulloch, 1435-1447 x 1448
 Thomas Etal, 1438
 Christopher Gynnis, 1448-1449
 Nicholas Blair, 1449
 Andrew Wishart, 1451-1456 x 1461
 James Kinnaird, 1465-1481
 Humphrey Clerk, 1513
 John Tyrie, 1527-1559 x
 Gilbert Foulsie, 1561-1580
 Thomas Swentoun, 1586-1626 x 1627
 Francis Liddell, 1627-1635

Notes

References
 Watt, D.E.R., Fasti Ecclesiae Scoticanae Medii Aevi ad annum 1638, 2nd Draft, (St Andrews, 1969), pp. 359–61

Orkney
History of Orkney
People associated with Orkney